The Hilleary T. Burrows House is an historic Queen Anne style home, located at 4520 River Road, Northwest, Washington, D.C., west of Tenley Circle, in the Tenleytown neighborhood.

It was built in 1897, from H. Galloway Ten Eyck pattern book, by B. N. Burgoyne.
It was added to the National Register of Historic Places in 2011.

References

Houses on the National Register of Historic Places in Washington, D.C.